Arthur Ford (born 1911, date of death unknown) was an English footballer who played at inside-left for Wolverhampton Wanderers, Port Vale, and Northampton Town.

Career
Ford played for Wolverhampton Wanderers, before joining Port Vale as an amateur in October 1936. He signed professional forms at The Old Recreation Ground in January 1937. He played three Third Division North games and one cup game from March 1937 to the end of the season, before transferring back to Wolves in September 1937. He later moved on to Northampton Town.

Career statistics
Source:

References

People from Wolstanton
English footballers
Association football forwards
Wolverhampton Wanderers F.C. players
Port Vale F.C. players
Northampton Town F.C. players
English Football League players
1911 births
Year of death missing